The Grand Cañon Forest Reserve was established by the General Land Office in Arizona on February 20, 1893 with . It was renamed Grand Canyon on August 8, 1906 and transferred to the U.S. Forest Service becoming a National Forest on March 4, 1907. On July 1, 1908 the entire forest was divided between Coconino National Forest and the newly established Kaibab National Forest, while other areas were returned to public lands, and the name was discontinued.

References

External links 
 Forest History Society
 Forest History Society: Listing of the National Forests of the United States Text from Davis, Richard C., ed. Encyclopedia of American Forest and Conservation History. New York: Macmillan Publishing Company for the Forest History Society, 1983. Vol. II, pp. 743–788.

Former National Forests of Arizona
Grand Canyon history
Kaibab National Forest
Coconino National Forest
1893 establishments in Arizona Territory
Protected areas established in 1893
1908 disestablishments in Arizona Territory
Protected areas disestablished in 1908